William Thorson (born c. 1983) is a Swedish professional poker player from Varberg, Sweden and a three time European Poker Tour (EPT) final table participant who, in the 2006 World Series of Poker (WSOP) Main Event, finished in 13th place.

In 2012, Thorson disappeared from the poker scene. In 2014, it was publicly confirmed that Thorson found a job at the Casa Blanca club in Barcelona, leaving poker behind.

Poker

World Series of Poker
Thorson has cashed four times at the World Series of Poker, most notably finishing in 13th place at the 2006 World Series of Poker Main Event earning $907,128. The tournament was eventually won by Jamie Gold. The next year at the 2007 World Series of Poker $5,000 World Championship Limit Hold'em event, Thorson finished 3rd earning $136,493, a tournament that was eventually won by Saro Getzoyan. Three years later at the 2010 World Series of Poker Main Event, Thorson finished in 22nd place earning $317,161.

European Poker Tour 
Thorson has made three final tables at the European Poker Tour, his first was at the EPT Dublin season three finishing 3rd for €184,780 ($232,340). He reached a second final table at the EPT San Remo season four, finishing 6th for €140,600 ($216,946), and a third at the EPT Dortmund season five, finishing 7th, earning €116,500. In addition he nearly made another final table coming in 9th at the PokerStars Caribbean Adventure season four, earning $120,000.

As of 2010, his total live tournament winnings exceed $2,425,000. His four cashes at the WSOP account for $1,052,884 of those winnings.

Top places in tournaments

References

External links
 CardPlayer.com profile
 PokerProMagazine.se profile
 William Thorson, a Young Professional Swedish Poker Player

1980s births
Swedish poker players
Living people
Date of birth missing (living people)
Place of birth missing (living people)
People from Varberg
Converts to Islam
Swedish Muslims